Chanti is a 1992 Indian Telugu-language drama film directed by Ravi Raja Pinisetty. The film stars Venkatesh, Meena with music composed by Illayaraja. The film was produced by K. S. Rama Rao on Creative Commercials banner. The film is a remake of the 1991 Tamil film Chinna Thambi. The make-up artist P. Sobhalatha received Nandi Award for the film. The film was recorded as a "Industry Hit" at the box office.

The film was the first film to cross 100 days in more than 40 direct centers that was an industry record at that time. It won four Nandi Awards.

Plot 
The story begins starts with the birth of a baby girl, Nandini, in the world of feudal landlords (Zamindars) whose word is a law for the villagers who work on their land. Nandini's three brothers throw a feast in honor of the girl child. The young son of the local singer (who had died) is brought in to sing for the event. The three brothers raise Nandini like their own child as their parents had died. At the age of 5, an astrologer predicts that Nandini will bring much happiness to the family, but her marriage will be based on her choice and not the choice of her brothers. This angers the brothers and to prevent this from happening, she is raised within the confines of the house. She is home schooled and when she does go out, all the men are warned to hide from Nandini and that seeing Nandini will be met with dire consequences.

Nandini reaches puberty. The few males allowed around her are the service staff and her bodyguards. Meanwhile, the boy who sang, Chanti grows up to be a naive and gullible simpleton with a heart of gold. He is raised by his widowed mother Kanthamma. He doesn't go to school and spends his time singing and entertaining the people of the village.

One day the bodyguards get into a fight with Chanti who beats them up. Impressed with Chanti's naivety and fighting skills, the Brothers hire Chanti to be Nandini's bodyguard and butler. Nandini meanwhile starts to resent her lack of freedom. She engages Chanti to show her the village without her brother's knowledge. Chanti complies with her wishes and shows her the village which results in Nandini getting sick. Chanti is blamed for Nandini getting sick and gets beaten up by the brothers. Nandini who has just started to like Chanti feels guilty for being the reason for him getting trashed. She shares her medicine with Chanti who inadvertently equates Nandini to his mother, as being the few people who truly care for him. This incident brings them closer together emotionally. Nandini realizes she is now in love with Chanti.

One day, a factory worker is punished for leering at Nandini. He plots to kill Nandini at the inauguration of the new factory owned by her brothers. Chanti overhears the plot, and in a desperate attempt to save Nandini lunges on her and inadvertently feels her up in public. Nandini doesn't mind and defends Chanti by arguing that Chanti wouldn't do something like that in public. But her brothers are enraged. They beat him to the point that they almost kill him. Nandini stops them and gives him a chance to explain. When Chanti explains the situation they hang their heads in shame. Chanti quits his job on the spot, despite Nandini's silent apology. That night Nandini decides to meet Chanti and apologize and perhaps convince him to come back to the job. Chanti refuses to come back as he doesn't want to put up with the violent nature of her brothers. She thinks if Chanti marries her, they won't be able to manhandle Chanti. She convinces Chanti to tie a wedding chain around her neck which will protect him from her brothers. Chanti without realizing the sanctity of the act does as told and doesn't realize he is now married to her.

Chanti comes back to work and is given a higher level of respect by the brothers for saving Nandini is life. Nandini too starts emulating her sisters-in-law in taking care of her husband. This makes Chanti nervous, but he still remains clueless, her change in behavior is noticed by her sister-in-law who urges the brothers to get Nandini married off before the situation gets any worse. Nandini realizing that they are trying to get her married off tries to make Chanti understand that they are already married. Chanti refuses to understand and runs away to his mother who upon realizing what has happened pulls him out of denial. She sends him away in an attempt to protect him.

The brothers come to know what's happened and try to torture the mother to get her to reveal where her son is hiding. She is saved in time by her son who almost kills the brothers. The wives of the brothers stop him from killing them and ask him to save Nandini who has upon hearing the torturous acts of her brothers has now resorted to self-destruction, with them embracing. Chanti rushes back to save his wife and revives her with his singing and movie ends with Nandini's recovery.

Cast

Production
K. S. Ramarao who saw the film Chinna Thambi bought the remake rights to do it in Telugu. He initially announced Rajendra Prasad as the lead actor but after the film's success he later selected Venkatesh as the actor.

Soundtrack

Music composed by Ilaiyaraaja. Music released on LEO Audio Company.

Box Office
The film is said to have grossed around Rs 16.15 crore.

Awards
Nandi Awards
Best Lyricist - Veturi
Best Male Playback Singer - S. P. Balasubrahmanyam
Best Makeup Artist - Shobalatha
Best Villain - Nassar

References

External links
 

1992 films
Telugu remakes of Tamil films
Indian romantic drama films
1992 romantic drama films
Films scored by Ilaiyaraaja
1990s Telugu-language films
Films directed by Ravi Raja Pinisetty